Schneider Hills is a group of hills lying south of San Martín Glacier and forming the south half of the Argentina Range, Pensacola Mountains. Mapped by United States Geological Survey (USGS) from surveys and U.S. Navy air photos, 1956–67. Named by Advisory Committee on Antarctic Names (US-ACAN) for Otto Schneider, chief scientist of the Instituto Antartico Argentino in this period.

Features
Geographical features include:

 Lisignoli Bluff
 Pujato Bluff
 Ruthven Bluff
 Sosa Bluff

Hills of Queen Elizabeth Land
Pensacola Mountains